Florent Obama (born 15 December 1991) is a Cameroonian professional footballer who plays as a defender for Rayong F.C. in the Thai League 2.

Career
Obama began playing football at l'École de Football des Brasseries du Cameroun (EFBC) in Douala. He moved abroad to play in Thailand before joining Moroccan side Moghreb Tétouan in 2015.

Honours
Buriram United
Thai Premier League: 2011
Thai FA Cup: 2011

References

1991 births
Living people
Cameroonian footballers
Association football defenders
Florent Obama
Florent Obama
Florent Obama

Moghreb Tétouan players
Florent Obama
Florent Obama
Florent Obama
Florent Obama
Florent Obama
Botola players
Cameroonian expatriate footballers
Expatriate footballers in Thailand
Expatriate footballers in Morocco
Cameroonian expatriate sportspeople in Thailand
Cameroonian expatriate sportspeople in Morocco